The Philadelphia Theatre Company (PTC) is a theater company located  Philadelphia, Pennsylvania. It was founded in 1974 as The Philadelphia Company by Robert Hedley and Jean Harrison.  Since October 2007, PTC's home has been the new Suzanne Roberts Theatre on the Avenue of the Arts.  This move concluded its 25-year residence at the historic Plays and Players Theatre.

History 

The Philadelphia Theatre Company was founded in 1974 by Robert Hedley and Jean Harrison. Soon thereafter, Sara Garonzik joined the company, eventually rising to the position of Producing Artistic Director. Joined in 1989 by General Manager Ada Coppock, Garonzik led the company to local and national prominence for her commitment to premiering new American plays. Together, Coppock and Garonzik built the Philadelphia Theatre Company into a commercial and artistic success, allowing them to eventually spearhead the building of a new home for the Philadelphia Theatre Company on the Avenue of the Arts, in the Suzanne Roberts Theatre.

In 2017, Paige Price assumed the role of Producing Artistic Director and was joined 5 months later by new Managing Director Emily Zeck.  The team had worked together previously at Theatre Aspen, a professional theatre in Aspen, Colorado, where they oversaw improvements in the financial and artistic health of the theatre, as well as completing a successful $2MM capital campaign for a new venue, the Hurst Theatre.

David L. Cohen, senior executive vice president and chief diversity officer at Comcast NBCUniversal, assumed the role of chair in 2017, completing a full leadership transition for the company.

Recent seasons

2006/2007 season 
 Murderers by Jeffrey Hatcher
 The Frog Bride by David Gonzalez
 Nerds://A Musical Software Satire (PTC world premiere musical) by Jordan Allen-Dutton, Erik Weiner & Hal Goldberg
 In The Continuum by Danai Gurira & Nikkole Salter
 Orson's Shadow by Austin Pendleton

2007/2008 season 
 Being Alive by Stephen Sondheim, Billy Porter & William Shakespeare
 M. Butterfly by David Henry Hwang
 Third by Wendy Wasserstein
 The Happiness Lecture by Bill Irwin

2008/2009 season 
 Unusual Acts of Devotion by Terrence McNally
 25 Questions for a Jewish Mother by Kate Moira Ryan & Judy Gold
 Resurrection by Daniel Beaty
 At Home at the Zoo by Edward Albee
 Grey Gardens by Doug Wright, Scott Frankel & Michael Korie
 City of Nutterly Love: Funny as Bell! by Ed Furman, TJ Shanoff, and The Second City

2009/2010 season 
 Humor Abuse by Lorenzo Pisoni and Erica Schmidt
 The Light in the Piazza by Craig Lucas and Adam Guettel
 Golden Age by Terrence McNally
 Red Hot Patriot: The Kick-Ass Wit of Molly Ivins by Margaret Engel and Allison Engel
 Ma Rainey’s Black Bottom by August Wilson
 The Second City 50th Anniversary Tour

2010/2011 season 
 The 25th Annual Putnam County Spelling Bee by William Finn
 Race by David Mamet
 Let Me Down Easy by Anna Deavere Smith
 Ruined by Lynn Nottage
 Colin Quinn: Long Story Short

2011/2012 season 
 Red by John Logan
 The Scottsboro Boys music and lyrics by John Kander and Fred Ebb, book by David Thompson
 The Outgoing Tide by Bruce Graham
 reasons to be pretty by Neil LaBute

2012/2013 season 
 Stars of David (world premiere musical) original book by Abigail Pogrebin book by Charles Busch conceived by Aaron Harnick
 The Mountaintop (play) by Katori Hall
 Seminar (play) by Theresa Rebeck
 Venus In Fur (play) by David Ives
 Love, Loss, and What I Wore (play) by Nora Ephron and Delia Ephron based on a book by Ilene Beckerman

2013/2014 season 
 4,000 Miles (play) written by Amy Herzog
 NERDS (play) book and lyrics by Jordan Allen-Dutton and Erik Weiner music by Hal Goldberg
 Tribes (play) book by Nina Raine
 Vanya and Sasha and Masha and Spike (play) by Christopher Durang
 Unconstitutional (play/comedy) written and performed by Colin Quinn

2014/2015 season 
 Detroit (play) written by Lisa D’Amour
 Outside Mullingar (play) book by John Patrick Shanley
 Mothers and Sons (play) by Terrence McNally
 brownsville song (b-side for tray) (play) by Kimber Lee
 Murder For Two (play) book and lyrics by Kellan Blair book and music by Joe Kinosian

2015/2016 season 
 Rizzo (play) written by Bruce Graham
 FOUND (musical) book by Hunter Bell and Lee Overtree music and lyrics by Eli Bolin
 Having Our Say: The Delany Sisters' First 100 Years (play) by Emily Mann
 Hand To God (play) by Robert Askins
 The Absolute Brightness of Leonard Pelkey (play) written and performed by Celeste Lecesne

2016/2017 season 
 Wrestling Jerusalem (play) written and performed by Aaron Davidman
 Small Mouth Sounds (play) by Bess Wohl

2017/2018 season 
 Sweat (Pulitzer Prize Winner) written by Lynn Nottage
 The Bridges of Madison County (musical) original book by Marsha Norman music and lyrics by Jason Robert Brown Based on the novel by Robert James Waller
 How to Catch Creation (play) by Christina Anderson

References 
Notes

External links 
 

Culture of Philadelphia
Theatre companies in Philadelphia